The Petit Mont Collon is a mountain of the Swiss Pennine Alps, located south of Arolla in the canton of Valais. It lies south of the Col de Chermotane and west of Mont Collon.

References

External links
Petit Mont Collon on Hikr

Mountains of the Alps
Alpine three-thousanders
Mountains of Switzerland
Mountains of Valais